Robert D. Arnott (born June 29, 1954) is an American businessman, investor, and writer who focuses on articles about quantitative investing.

He is the founder and chairman of the board of Research Affiliates, an asset management firm. Research Affiliates develops investment strategies for other firms, and there are over US$166 billion assets under the management of firms using their strategies as of September 2021. He edited CFA Institute's Financial Analysts Journal from 2002 to 2006, and has edited three books on equity management and tactical asset allocation. Arnott is a co-author of the book The Fundamental Index: A Better Way to Invest, and co-editor of three other books relating to asset allocation and equity market investing.

Arnott has also served as a Visiting Professor of Finance at the UCLA Anderson School of Management, on the editorial board of the Journal of Portfolio Management, the product advisory board of the Chicago Mercantile Exchange, and the Chicago Board Options Exchange. He previously served as Chairman of First Quadrant, LP, as global equity strategist at Salomon (now Salomon Smith Barney), president of TSA Capital Management (now TSA/Analytic), and as vice president at the Boston Company.

Arnott has received seven Graham and Dodd Scrolls and Awards, awarded annually by the CFA Institute for best articles of the year, and has received four Bernstein-Fabozzi/Jacobs-Levy awards from the Journal of Portfolio Management and Institutional Investor magazine.

Education and personal life
Arnott graduated summa cum laude from UCSB in 1977 with a degree in economics, applied mathematics and computer science. While a high school student in 1970, he attended the Summer Science Program.

He is married with three children. As of 2019, Arnott lived in Miami Beach, Florida.

Writing

Arnott has published over 130 academic papers in refereed journals. Topics of these papers have included the following: mutual fund returns, the equity risk premium, tactical asset allocation, and alternative index investing.

Career
In 2002, Arnott founded Research Affiliates, a Newport Beach, California-based investment management firm. As of June 30, 2021, about $171 billion in assets are managed worldwide using investment strategies developed by Research Affiliates. The firm has been involved with fundamentally based indexes since mid-2004 and has worked with the FTSE Group to create indices based on this methodology. Research Affiliates licenses its indexes to Schwab, Invesco and PIMCO.

In November, 2009, Research Affiliates was granted a patent for their index methodology that selects and weights securities using fundamental measures of company size. 

Arnott co-manages the PIMCO All Asset Fund, a tactical fund of funds with $16 billion in assets as of March 2022, which can invest in any of PIMCO's many mutual funds.

Political contributions
Arnott has given $750,000 to support the Club for Growth, a politically conservative group advocating lower tax rates. Arnott considers himself a libertarian, and opposes the Patient Protection and Affordable Care Act. 
In 2015, Arnott donated $100,000 to America's Liberty PAC, a political action committee formed in support of Representative Rand Paul's 2016 presidential bid.

References

External links
 Research Affiliates, LLC
RAFI Indices, LLC

1954 births
Living people
American business writers
American chief executives of financial services companies
American finance and investment writers
American financial company founders
American investors
American money managers
PIMCO
Summer Science Program
University of California, Santa Barbara alumni